Worzel Gummidge Turns Detective is a British children's television series, first aired by the BBC in 1953. It was the first TV manifestation of Barbara Euphan Todd's character who had already appeared on radio and would reappear on television 26 years later.

Cast
Frank Atkinson as Worzel Gummidge (4 episodes, 1953)
Carol Olver as Penny (4 episodes, 1953)
Mabel Constanduros as Earthy Mangold (4 episodes, 1953)
Margaret Boyd as Mrs. Braithwaite (4 episodes, 1953)
David Coote as Andrew (4 episodes, 1953)
Janet Joye as Mrs. Bloomsbury-Barton (4 episodes, 1953)
Alanna Boyce as Shirley Morgan (2 episodes, 1953)
Vernon Smythe as Mr. Dyke (2 episodes, 1953)
Totti Truman Taylor as Aunt Sally (1 episode, 1953)

Episodes
Enter Two Scarecrows (10 February 1953)
Aunt Sally (17 February 1953)
Gummidge, the Sweep (24 February 1953)
Gummidge Disappears (3 March 1953)

References

External links

BBC children's television shows
1950s British children's television series
1953 British television series debuts
1953 British television series endings